The 458th Airlift Squadron is part of the 375th Airlift Wing at Scott Air Force Base, Illinois.  It operates C-21 aircraft providing executive airlift and aeromedical evacuation.  It has performed its current mission since activating in 1975 as the 1401st Military Airlift Squadron.  The 1401st Squadron was consolidated with the 458th in 1991.

The squadron was first activated during World War II as the 458th Bombardment Squadron.  It was a replacement training unit for heavy bomber crews until being inactivated in the spring of 1944 when the Army Air Forces reorganized its training and support units in the United States.  It was reactivated the same day as a Boeing B-29 Superfortress unit.  The unit deployed to the Pacific Ocean Theater in early 1945 and participated in the strategic bombing campaign against Japan until V-J Day, earning two Distinguished Unit Citations for its actions.  The squadron returned to the United States in December 1945 and was inactivated.

The squadron was redesignated the 458th Troop Carrier Squadron and activated in the reserve in 1952, but was quickly inactivated as reserve units that had been mobilized for the Korean War were released from active duty.  As the Air Force assumed the light airlift mission from the Army, the squadron was again activated on New Year's Day 1967.  It served in combat in Vietnam until March 1972, earning an additional Presidential Unit Citation and three Air Force Outstanding Unit Awards with Combat "V" Device before inactivating in theater.

History

World War II

Replacement training unit
Established in mid-1942 under II Bomber Command as a Boeing B-17 Flying Fortress Replacement Training Unit.  Operated until March 1944.

B-29 Superfortress operations against Japan
Redesignated on 1 April 1944 as a Boeing B-29 Superfortress very heavy bombardment squadron.  When training was completed moved to North Field, Guam in the Mariana Islands of the Central Pacific Area in January 1945 and assigned to XXI Bomber Command, Twentieth Air Force. Its mission was the strategic bombardment of the Japanese Home Islands and the destruction of its war-making capability.

The squadron flew "shakedown" missions against Japanese targets on Moen Island, Truk, and other points in the Carolines and Marianas.  The squadron began combat missions over Japan on 12 April 1945 with a bombing mission over Koriyama, Japan to strike the Hodogaya Chemical Plant.  The squadron continued to participate in wide area firebombing attacks, but the first ten-day-long blitz resulted in the Army Air Forces running out of incendiary bombs. Until then the squadron flew conventional strategic bombing missions using high explosive bombs.

The squadron continued attacking urban areas with incendiary raids until the end of the war in August 1945, attacking major Japanese cities, causing massive destruction of urbanized areas.  Also conducted raids against strategic objectives, bombing aircraft factories, chemical plants, oil refineries, and other targets in Japan. The squadron flew its last combat missions on 14 August when hostilities ended.  Afterwards, its B 29s carried relief supplies to Allied prisoner of war camps in Japan and Manchuria.

The squadron remained in Western Pacific, although largely demobilized in the fall of 1945.   Some aircraft were scrapped on Tinian; others flown to storage depots in the United States. The unit was inactivated as part of Army Service forces in December 1945.

Air Force reserve

Activated as a C-46 Commando Troop Carrier Squadron in June 1952.  Inactivated in July 1952.

Vietnam War
Reactivated during the Vietnam War at Cam Ranh Air Base, South Vietnam in 1966.  Provided intratheater airlift in Vietnam, including airland and airdrop assault missions from, 1966–1972, being inactivated as part of the drawdown of United States forces and the closure of Cam Ranh AB. and military airlift operations worldwide from 1975 to 1978.

Executive airlift
It conducted airlift in Southwest Asia from August 1990 – May 1991.

Campaigns and decorations
 Campaigns: World War II: Western Pacific; Air Offensive, Japan; Vietnam Air Offensive; Vietnam Air Offensive, Phase II; Vietnam Air/Ground 1968; Vietnam Air Offensive, Phase III; Vietnam Air Offensive, Phase IV; TET 69/ Counteroffensive; Vietnam Summer-Fall 1969; Vietnam Winter-Spring 1970; Sanctuary Counteroffensive; Southwest Monsoon; Commando Hunt V; Commando Hunt VI; Commando Hunt VII; Intratheater airlift in Southwest Asia, August 1990 – April 1991;
 Decorations: Distinguished Unit Citations:   Japan, 10 May 1945; Tokyo and Yokohama, Japan, 23–29 May 1945.  Presidential Unit Citations (Southeast Asia) 21 Jan-12 May 1968; 1 Apr-30 June 1970; Navy Presidential Unit Citation: Vietnam, 20 Jan-1 April 1968; Air Force Outstanding Unit Award with Combat "V" Device 1 Jan-30 April 1967; 1 May 1967 – 30 April 1968; 1 July 1970 – 31 December 1971. Republic of Vietnam Gallantry Cross with Palm: 1 January 1967 – 30 April 1972; Air Force Outstanding Unit Awards-1 Jul-31 December 1975; 1 January 1976 – 31 January 1977; 1 June 1981 – 31 May 1982; 1 June 1982 – 30 June 1983; 1 June 1986 – 31 July 1988

Lineage
 458th Airlift Squadron
 Constituted as the 458th Bombardment Squadron (Heavy) on 1 July 1942
 Activated on 6 July 1942
 Inactivated on 1 April 1944
 Redesignated 458th Bombardment Squadron, Very Heavy and activated, on 1 April 1944
 Inactivated on 27 December 1945
 Redesignated 458th Troop Carrier Squadron, Medium on 26 May 1952
 Activated in the reserve on 14 June 1952
 Inactivated on 14 July 1952
 Redesignated 458th Troop Carrier Squadron and activated on 12 October 1966 (not organized)
 Organized on 1 January 1967
 Redesignated 458th Tactical Airlift Squadron on 1 August 1967
 Inactivated on 1 March 1972
 Consolidated with the 1401st Military Airlift Squadron as the 458th Airlift Squadron on 1 December 1991

 1401st Military Airlift Squadron
 Designated as the 1401st Military Airlift Squadron and activated on 1 April 1975.
 Consolidated with the 458th Tactical Airlift Squadron as the 458th Airlift Squadron on 1 December 1991

Assignments
 330th Bombardment Group, 6 July 1952 – 1 April 1944
 330th Bombardment Group, 1 April 1944 – 27 December 1945
 330th Troop Carrier Group, 14 June–14 July 1952
 Pacific Air Forces, 12 October 1966 (not organized)
 483d Troop Carrier Wing (later 483d Tactical Airlift Wing), 1 January 1967 – 1 March 1972
 89th Military Airlift Wing, 1 April 1975
 375th Aeromedical Airlift Wing (later 375th Military Airlift Wing), 15 March 1978
 375th Operations Group, 1 December 1991 – present

Stations

 Salt Lake City Army Air Base, Utah, 6 July 1942
 Alamogordo Army Air Field, New Mexico, 1 August 1942
 Biggs Field, Texas, 2 September 1942
 Alamogordo Army Air Field, New Mexico, 29 November 1942
 Biggs Field, Texas, 5 April 1943 – 1 April 1944
 Walker Army Air Field, Kansas, 1 April 1944
 Dalhart Army Air Field, Texas, 25 May 1944
 Walker Army Air Field, Kansas, 1 August 1944 – 7 January 1945

 North Field, Guam, Mariana Islands, 18 February–19 November 1945
 Camp Anza, California, c. 18–27 December 1945
 Greater Pittsburgh Airport, Pennsylvania, 14 Jun-14 July 1952
 Cam Ranh Air Base, South Vietnam, 1 January 1966 – 30 April 1972
 Scott Air Force Base, Illinois, 1 April 1975 – present

Aircraft

 Boeing B-17 Flying Fortress (1942, 1944)
 Consolidated B-24 Liberator (1942–1944)
 Boeing B-29 Superfortress (1944–1945)
 de Havilland Canada C-7 Caribou (1967–1972)
 North American T-39 Sabreliner (1975–1984)
 Beechcraft C-12 Huron (1976–1977, 1984 – ??)
 Learjet C-21 (1984 – present)

References

Notes
 Explanatory notes

 Citations

Bibliography

External links
375th Operations Group

Military units and formations in Illinois
458